The 2011–12 Liga Nacional Superior de Voleibol Femenino (Spanish for: 2011-12 Women's Senior National Volleyball League) or 2011-12 LNSVF is the 8th official season of the Peruvian Volleyball League. Deportivo Géminis won the league championship and qualified to the Women's South American Volleyball Club Championship but refused its participation.

Competing Teams

  Alianza Lima (ALI)
  Universidad César Vallejo (UCV)
  Circolo Sportivo Italiano (CSI)
  Deportivo Alianza (DAL)
  Géminis (GEM)
  Divino Maestro (CDM)
  Latino Amisa (LAT)
  Regatas Lima (CRL)
  Universidad San Martín (USM)
  Sporting Cristal (SCR)
  Túpac Amaru (TUP)
  Wanka Surco (WKA)

Competition format
Because of preparation of some of the players for the London Olympics, this season will not have an "Apertura and Clausura" format, instead it will only have one tournament with two round-robyn rounds. The 2011-12 season started on November 16, 2011 was expected to conclude in April 2012.

First round

The first round is a Round-Robyn system where all 12 teams will play once against the other 11, due to preparation of some of the players for the London Olympics, and because the league couldn't get 14 first division teams to sign, this round will serve as the Apertura round.

Pool standing procedure
 Match points
 Numbers of matches won
 Sets ratio
 Points ratio
Match won 3–0 or 3–1: 3 match points for the winner, 0 match points for the loserMatch won 3–2: 2 match points for the winner, 1 match point for the loser

Second round

The second round of the tournament, also known as the play-offs, will see the 12 teams from the first round compete in another Round-Robyn system, the top 7 teams plus the best team from Round 1 (Géminis) will move on to the knockout stage. It began February 1, 2012 and is expected to conclude March 23, 2012.

Pool standing procedure
 Match points
 Numbers of matches won
 Sets ratio
 Points ratio
Match won 3–0 or 3–1: 3 match points for the winner, 0 match points for the loserMatch won 3–2: 2 match points for the winner, 1 match point for the loser

Final round
The final round of the tournament is a knockout stage, teams play the quarterfinals seeded according to how they finished ranking-wise in the second round. The Final Round will begin March 24, 2012 and it is expected to crown the champion team April 14, 2012. This round is played best-out-of-three games, for a team to move on to the next stage, they have to win twice against the opposite team.

Quarterfinals

1Alianza Lima won third leg 3-2.

First leg

Second leg

Extra Games

Bronze-medal matches

First leg

Second leg

Gold-medal matches

First leg

Second leg

Final standing

Sara Joya,
Lesly Díaz,
Ingrid Herrada,
Patricia Soto,
Milagros Rodríguez,
Yvón Cancino,
Danae Carranza (L),
Grecia Herrada,
Florencia Busquets,
Kiara Carrión,
Alison Lora,
Carla Rueda

Controversy
Deportivo Géminis qualified to the 2012 South American Club Championship, however the club declined to go.

Universidad San Martín as second best was invited to go, the team accepted; however the club also declined to go just a week before the competition. Cenaida Uribe, team manager quoted that since the club was not the winning team of the season, they were not given information about the Continental Club Championship.

So far, either the FPV or the LNSV has officially spoken about the qualification of Peruvian teams to the Club Championship and/or how to prevent this from happening again.

Individual awards

Most Valuable Player
 Patricia Soto (Deportivo Géminis)
Best Scorer
 Daniela Uribe (Alianza Lima)
Best Spiker
 Yonkaira Peña (Universidad San Martín)
Best Blocker
 Cándida Arias (Universidad San Martín)
Best Server
 Mirian Patiño (Túpac Amaru)
Best Digger
 Mirian Patiño (Túpac Amaru)
Best Setter
 Yvon Cancino (Deportivo Géminis)
Best Receiver
 Janice Torres (Túpac Amaru)
Best Libero
 Vanessa Palacios (Divino Maestro)

References

External links
LNSV
Voleibol.pe

Volleyball competitions in Peru
2011 in Peruvian sport
2012 in Peruvian sport